The Sierra Jensen Series is a teen book series by Christian author Robin Jones Gunn. It is a companion series to Gunn's The Christy Miller series, as Sierra's character was introduced in the twelfth book of Christy's series.

Novels in the series
 Only You Sierra 
In Your Dreams 
Don't You Wish
Close Your Eyes
Without a Doubt
With This Ring
Open Your Heart 
Time Will Tell
Now Picture This
Hold on Tight
Closer Than Ever
Take My Hand
Love Finds You In Sunset Beach, Hawaii

External links
 Website
 Author's Site

American Christian novels